Senator Logan may refer to:

Members of the United States Senate
Charles Logan (24 character), fictional U.S. Senator in the television series 24
George Logan (Pennsylvania politician) (1753–1821), U.S. Senator from Pennsylvania
John A. Logan (1826–1886), U.S. Senator from Illinois from 1879 to 1886
M. M. Logan (1874–1939), U.S. Senator from Kentucky
William Logan (Kentuckian) (1776–1822), U.S. Senator from Kentucky

United States state senate members
Edward Lawrence Logan (1875–1939), Massachusetts State Senate
George Logan (Connecticut politician), Connecticut State Senate
Henry Logan (politician) (1784–1866), Pennsylvania State Senate
John Logan (pioneer) (1747–1807), Kentucky State Senate
Sean Logan (born 1970), Pennsylvania State Senate